Doors Open Saskatoon is a biannual event held in the City of Saskatoon, Saskatchewan, Canada, that gives the public access to many of the city's unique or historically significant buildings. Admission is free of charge.  The one day even occurs every two years.   The fifth doors open even occurred in Saskatoon in 2011.

Over 20 buildings were included in the 2011 event.  Some of the buildings included:
 2nd Avenue Lofts
 Avenue Building
 Drinkle Building
 
 Hotel Senator
 John Deere Building
 Kindrachuk Agrey Building
 Marr Residence
 Odd Fellows Temple Building
 Remai Arts Centre
 Saskatoon Public Schools Head-office

See also
 Doors Open Canada

Notes

External links
 Doors Open Saskatoon

Saskatoon
Culture of Saskatoon
Tourist attractions in Saskatoon